Danny James Buckingham (born 2 December 1964) is an Australian former cricketer, who played for the Tasmanian Tigers from 1983–84 until 1993–94.

Buckingham was a reliable batting all-rounder, who only very occasionally bowled his right-arm leg spin, but contributed with the bat for Tasmania at a time when the fledgling state side was struggling for success.

His dogged contributions for a side which only very rarely won matches sees him as a member of the state's elite Cricket Hall of Fame.

External links

1964 births
Living people
Australian cricketers
Tasmania cricketers
People from Burnie, Tasmania
Cricketers from Tasmania